The spotted redshank (Tringa erythropus) is a wader (shorebird) in the large bird family Scolopacidae. The genus name Tringa is the New Latin name given to the green sandpiper by Aldrovandus in 1599 based on Ancient Greek trungas, a thrush-sized, white-rumped, tail-bobbing wading bird mentioned by Aristotle. The specific erythropus is from Ancient Greek eruthros, "red", and pous, "foot".

It breeds across northern Scandinavia and the northern Palearctic and migrates south to the Mediterranean, the southern British Isles, France, tropical Africa, and tropical Asia for the winter. It is an occasional vagrant to Australia and North America.

Taxonomy
The spotted redshank was described by German zoologist Peter Simon Pallas in 1764 and given the binomial name Scolopax erythropus.
It is a monotypic species, with no recognised subspecies. Taxonomically, it forms a close-knit group with several other large Tringa species, with molecular sequencing showing it to be a sister clade to that containing the greater yellowlegs and the common greenshank.

Description
It is black in breeding plumage, and very pale in winter. It has a red legs and bill, and shows a white oval on the back in flight. Juveniles are grey-brown finely speckled white above, and have pale, finely barred underparts. 
Adults moult completely between July and October. In spring, the body plumage is moulted between March and May. Juveniles have a partial moult between August and February. 
The call is a creaking whistle teu-it (somewhat similar to the call of a roseate tern), the alarm call a kyip-kyip-kyip.

Habitat and range
The spotted redshank breeds in the Arctic across much of the Palearctic, from Lapland in the west to Chukotskaya in the east.

Behaviour

Food and feeding
Like most waders, it feeds on small invertebrates.

Breeding

It nests on open boggy taiga, laying four eggs in a ground scrape. For breeding the bird moults to a black to dark grey with white spots. During breeding plumage the legs also turn a dark grey. See image alongside.

Conservation and threats
The spotted redshank is one of the species to which the Agreement on the Conservation of African-Eurasian Migratory Waterbirds (AEWA) applies.

Notes

References

Sources

External links 

 
 
 
 
 
 
 
 
 

spotted redshank
Wading birds
Birds of Scandinavia
Birds of Russia
spotted redshank
Taxa named by Peter Simon Pallas